Landon Mackenzie  (born November 29, 1954) is a Canadian artist based in Vancouver, British Columbia. She is nationally known for her large-format paintings and her contribution as a professor at the Emily Carr University of Art and Design (she is now Professor Emeritus).

Early life and education 
Mackenzie was born was in Boston, Massachusetts and grew up in Toronto, Ontario. She has credited the mentorship of the Painter's 11's Harold Town, a friend of her parents and neighbour of her grandmother as being one of her inspirations around her decision to pursue a career as an artist, she has said "I went into Harold's studio and I just thought 'I want this'". She earned a Bachelor's Fine Arts degree from the Nova Scotia School of Art and Design in 1976 where she studied printmaking with a focus on etching and earned a Master's of Fine Arts from Concordia University in 1979 where she studied with Guido Molinari and Irene F. Whittome. Mackenzie studied printmaking at both NSCAD and Concordia, it was not until after completing art school that she began to fully pursue a career in painting.

Career 
Aware of the limits placed on many female artists, Mackenzie used her name "Landon", which is commonly used as boys name, to her advantage in the early years of her career, as she has said "people thought I was a guy". Mackenzie began her teaching career by teaching Studio Arts at Concordia University from 1978-1985, before relocating to Vancouver in 1986 and joining the faculty at the Emily Carr University of Art and Design. 

Her paintings are characteristically large and intensely involved in the continuation of the discipline of painting. Her works have been featured in several shows at the National Gallery of Canada and the Vancouver Art Gallery. Her paintings have also been exhibited at the Museum of Contemporary Canadian Art and in many solo and group shows in Canada and internationally, over the past thirty years. Mackenzie's works have been extensively written about both in the popular media and academically.

Mackenzie is known to be a significant mentor to younger artists coming out of Vancouver. She has been an influential educator, as Mackenzie herself studied during the last half of the hotbed time of Conceptual Art at NSCAD in Halifax, from 1972-1976. This period was of great interest to many young artists working around her. In her graduate school period in Montreal at Concordia University, from 1976–1979, Mackenzie developed her own voice as a more mature artist at a time of heightened contest between the acclaimed painters and sculptors involved in the last throes of high Modernism and the beginnings of a Post-Modern consciousness in art practice. She won the Third Biennale of Quebec Painting (1981) for her critically acclaimed Lost River Series characterized within the movement of New Image Painting. 

Mackenzie was the first to receive the rank of full professor, when the Emily Carr University of Art and Design, (formerly known as the Vancouver School of Art, established 1923, then a College, then an Institute), became a University in 2008. In 2009 she was awarded the inaugural Ian Wallace Excellence in Teaching Award for her passionate contribution to the school and art in Vancouver. In 2012, Mackenzie is also the recipient of the Queen Elizabeth II Diamond Jubilee Medal for her service to Canada in Visual Art.

In several of her large-scale paintings from the early 1990s to 2009, Mackenzie layered research notes, annotated maps, archival texts and documentation of her investigations and explorations of geographic regions. The most recent of these works is 'Vancouver As the Centre of the World' commissioned for the 2010 Winter Olympic Games. She is particularly interested in current research on the brain and neural mapping in relationship to the mapping of our physical environment leading to recent series 'Neurocity' and 'The Structures', some of which were the subject of a five-year survey exhibition in 2011 at The Richmond Art Gallery in Canada. Often her work hovers in both regions of abstract and representational art.

Selected collections
National Gallery of Canada
Musée national des beaux-arts du Québec

Selected awards
Queen Elizabeth II Golden Jubilee Medal 2003
Canada Council Grant to Established Artists 1998, 1999, 2005
Canada Council Paris Studio Residency Award 2008
Ian Wallace Excellence in Teaching Award, 2009
Queen Elizabeth II Diamond Jubilee Medal, 2012
Governor General's Award in Visual and Media Arts 2017

References

External links

1954 births
Living people
American emigrants to Canada
Artists from Boston
NSCAD University alumni
Members of the Royal Canadian Academy of Arts
Canadian women painters
Governor General's Award in Visual and Media Arts winners
20th-century Canadian painters
21st-century Canadian painters
20th-century Canadian women artists
21st-century Canadian women artists